= Entertainment media =

Entertainment media may refer to:

- Entertainment
- Mass media

== See also ==
- Media (communication)
